The 2nd Guards Mixed Brigade was a military unit of the Imperial Japanese Army.

History
After the Imperial Guards Division split in 1939, the 3rd and 4th Guards Infantry Regiments, with the remaining support and service units became the 2nd Guards Mixed Brigade. In 1940 it went to China, stopping in Shanghai before receiving a posting to Hainan Island. In June 1941, the 5th Guards Infantry Regiment and Guards Reconnaissance Regiment joined it there and the brigade became the Imperial Guard Division again.

See also
List of IJA Mixed Brigades

References 

Japanese World War II brigades
Military units and formations established in 1939
Military units and formations disestablished in 1941